Galium saxatile or heath bedstraw is a plant species of the genus Galium.  It is related to cleavers.

Galium saxatile is a perennial mat-forming herb, found on grassland, moors, heaths and woods. The stems are hairless and four sided. The mountain ringlet butterfly uses the plant for nectar.

Galium saxatile is widespread across much of northern and central Europe from Portugal and Ireland to Scandinavia, France, Germany, Poland, Ukraine and Russia. It is also reportedly sparingly naturalized in Quebec, California and the Falkland Islands.

Gallery

References

The Wild Flower Key British Isles – NW Europe by Francis Rose
Wild Flowers of Britain by Roger Phillips

External links

Skye Flora
Luontoportti, Nature Gate, Heath Bedstraw
Tela Botanica
Den Virtuella floran, Stenmåra, Galium saxatile L.
Besançon, Gaillet des rochers, Galium saxatile
Wilde planten in Nederland en België, Liggend walstro, Plat slyt, Gaillet des rochers, Harzer Labkraut, Heath Bedstraw

saxatile
Flora of Belgium
Flora of Quebec
Flora of California
Flora of the Falkland Islands
Flora of Portugal
Flora of the Azores
Flora of the United Kingdom
Flora of France
Flora of Germany
Flora of Poland
Flora of Ukraine
Flora of Russia
Flora of Switzerland
Flora of Norway
Flora of Sweden
Flora of the Faroe Islands
Plants described in 1753
Taxa named by Carl Linnaeus
Flora without expected TNC conservation status